Tennessee 2004 is a live album by the experimental rock band Praxis, released in 2007 but recorded at the Bonnaroo Music and Arts Festival near Manchester, Tennessee during the early morning hours of June 12, 2004.

This album features core Praxis members Bill Laswell, Buckethead and Brain, in addition to keyboardist Bernie Worrell.

An extended recording of that show, including tracks that are missing from the 2007 CD release, is available as a paid download from the Bonnaroo website.

Track listing

Notes

 "Vertebrae" is an early version of Buckethead's song "Jordan", which was released as a single two years later.
 "Night Of The Slunk" originally featured on Buckethead's 1999 album Monsters and Robots.
 "Guitar Virus" incorporates Buckethead's song "Big Sur Moon" from the 1998 album Colma.
 "Bent Light" is an alternate version of "The Interworld And The New Innocence" from the band's 1992 album Transmutation (Mutatis Mutandis).
 "Magus" includes themes from the Miles Davis composition "Dark Magus".

Personnel
Buckethead - electric guitar
Bill Laswell - bass guitar
Brain - drums, percussion
Bernie Worrell - keyboards

Production Staff
 John Brown - cover design
 James Dellatacoma - assistant
 Michael Fossenkemper - mastering
 Oz Fritz - engineer

References 

2007 live albums
Praxis (band) albums
ROIR live albums